Tringilburra is a genus of moths of the family Noctuidae.

Species
 Tringilburra lugens Lucas, 1901

References
Natural History Museum Lepidoptera genus database
Tringilburra at funet

Hadeninae